The People's Party of Russia (PPR or NPR; ; Narodnaya partiya Rossii, NPR) was a Russian center-left political party created by political strategist Andrei Bogdanov, which existed in 2012-2019. Journalists often called it the spoiler party.

History 
The party was formed on April 11, 2012 and registered by the Russian Ministry of Justice on May 28 under the chairmanship of the board of Alexander Vasenin - born on December 16, 1990 from Moscow, interested in rap culture, and a friend of Denis Bogdanov, the eldest son of Democratic Party of Russia leader Andrei Bogdanov. The chairman of the Supreme Council of the party was a political strategist, director of the PR agency KG Aranovich and Partners LLC, president of the investment Russia public organization Stanislav Aranovich - born on July 08, 1983 from Saransk,. Previously, Stanislav Aranovich was the head of the youth department of the Mordovian branch of the Union of Right Forces; from 2006-2008 Democratic Party of Russia; 2008-2012 Right Cause.

The party itself did not have a program, while the Voronezh regional branch of the party in its program was an adherent of the ideology of anarchism and uses its own party symbols, which are different from the central one.

The party was created with the participation of the leader of the Democratic Party of Russia (DPR) and the Center of Political Technologies of the same name, Andrei Bogdanov, this was announced on July 18 at a joint press conference of the Coordinating Council - Technical Coalition, at which Bogdanov officially presented five new his participation in political parties: the restored Democratic Party of Russia, as well as the Union of Citizens under the leadership of Dmitry Popkov, the Social Democratic Party of Russia under the leadership of Viktor Militarev, the Communist Party of Social Justice under the leadership of Yuri Morozov and the People's Party of Russia, Which was represented by Stanislav Aranovich as its leader. The party is a member of the "Coordinating Council - Technical Coalition", created on the initiative of the leader of the DPR Andrey Bogdanov. The number of party members for 2012 is 500 people (the minimum required number of members for registration of a political party after the amendments to the federal law FZ-95 of March 23, 2012).

The Internet edition Lenta.ru stated that the party of the same name is a spoiler and the party business of its owners, political strategists Bogdanov and Aranovich. The registered brand they own was put up for sale, as evidenced by the party's program, which consists of three general proposals, published on the website of the Ministry of Justice of Russia.

On December 3, 2013, in connection with the events at Euromaidan, party leader Stanislav Aranovich, together with lawyer Dmitry Tretyakov, made a statement that Russia within the CIS is obliged to come up with an initiative for the Government of Ukraine to provide support against the opposition up to force intervention by sending the forces of the Ministry of Internal Affairs of Russia to help their Ukrainian colleagues.

On June 14, 2019, the Supreme Court, at the suit of the Ministry of Justice, liquidated the party for seven years for not participating in the regional elections.

Elections

2012 
On October 14, 2012, the party took part in 3 out of 6 regional legislative assemblies. According to their results, the party did not receive a single mandate: North Ossetia (448) 0.20% of the votes, Penza Oblast (2020) 0.37% of votes, Tver Oblast (229) 0.28% of the votes.

2013 
On July 10, 2013, at the elections to the Togliatti Duma, the center of Andrei Bogdanov submitted documents for 7 parties, including the People's Party of Russia; on July 12, the city election commission refused to register all seven parties, but already on July 24, the higher Samara Regional Election Commission canceled the decision of the local election commission and returned the parties to registration, who subsequently received 370 votes (0.23%).

On June 20, 2013, at the elections for the head of the city of Voronezh, the people's party nominated the head of the urban settlement of Semiluki Nikolai Markov (born 1981) (previously composed and elected with the support of the Communist Party), who later gained 7,198 votes (3.74%).

In the elections on a single voting day on September 8, 2013, the party nominated its candidates mainly on party lists, with an average turnout of 30-35%, having received the following result:

 Arkhangelsk Oblast, Arkhangelsk Regional Assembly of Deputies 541 votes (0.22%), in the city council of Arkhangelsk received 116 votes (0.21%)

 Kemerovo Oblast, Council of People's Deputies of the Kemerovo region 930 votes (0.06%)

 Smolensk Oblast, Smolensk Regional Duma 664 votes (0.28%)

 Yakutia, State Assembly 1,090 votes (0.39%), 112 votes to the city duma of Yakutia (0.20%),to the City Duma of Yakutsk 112 votes (0.20%)

 Buryatia, People's Khural 703 votes (0.24%)

 Chechen Republic, Parliament 163 votes (0.03%)

In 2016, the party did not participate in the elections to the State Duma of the 7th convocation; the party did not have a representative in the regional or city parliament and was not exempt from collecting signatures. The party did not collect signatures for nomination.

In October 2017, ahead of the 2018 Russian presidential election, the party entered the association of non-parliamentary parties “Forum“ Third Power ”, nominating a candidate for the primaries of the bloc, chairman of the“ National Parents' Committee ”Irina Volynets.

Leadership 

 Stanislav Aranovich — Chairman of the Supreme Council

See also 

 People's Party of the Russian Federation (NPRF) — existed in Russia from 1999 to 2007
 Political parties in Russia

References

External links 

 Official website of the Third Force Forum
 Official site of the party chairman Stanislav Aranovich
 Archive of the Official website www.narodpp.ru
Defunct political parties in Russia
Political parties established in 2012